Dixonville is a small unincorporated community in Escambia County, Alabama, United States, on the Florida border. The community name continues south of the border as Dixonville, Florida.

References

Unincorporated communities in Alabama
Unincorporated communities in Escambia County, Alabama